Anti-American sentiment in Pakistan has been evident through public demonstrations, general public opinion of USA being a morally corrupt nation and anti Islamic and burning of the flag of the United States. When measured in 2009 Pakistan was amongst the countries with the strongest such antipathy. Pakistanis have the least favorable view of USA compared to any other major country, as per various surveys. Americans are seen as vain, unislamic, invaders, inhumane and morally corrupt. According to Anatol Lieven, anti-American sentiment in Pakistan is characterised more by religious undertones mixed with political hostilities rather than racial undertones. USA is seen as an usurper of Islamic hegemony over world as deemed by Allah. 

Though, maybe not as justification but at least to understand the situation, America's actions for money and power (economic and political) has influenced indirectly and directly the death of millions of Muslims in Muslim-majority countries. Such a view can be historically evidenced and defended. The idea is that, though there may be some aggressive people and groups, they represent a minuscule percentage of the Muslim societies. Due to these, movements like ‘The war on terror’ and their people, are seen in some ways as the terrorists themselves by causing, literally, terror. 

Reasons for unpopularity have included cultural issues and US foreign policy actions. Cultural grievances have been perceived affronts to Islam by US citizens. Unpopular foreign policy actions have included U.S. military actions on Pakistani soil such as drone attacks, 
the operation to kill Osama Bin Laden
and the 2011 NATO attack in Pakistan, as well CIA activities such as the Raymond Allen Davis incident, and the perceived inadequate US response to the humanitarian crisis of the 2010 Pakistan floods.

A 2014 Pew Research Center poll suggested that 59% of Pakistanis viewed the United States either very unfavorably or somewhat unfavorably, down from 80% in 2012.

During the 2022 Pakistani constitutional crisis, PTI leader Imran Khan named the United States as the country in question over a 'threatening letter' and blames America for his downfall, according to a survey by Gallup Pakistan, most Pakistanis were ‘angry’ about the removal of Khan as prime minister, and close to a majority believe his claims that his downfall was due to an American ‘regime change’ campaign.

See also
Anti-Americanism
Pakistan–United States relations
1979 U.S. embassy burning in Islamabad
Anti-Americanism in Afghanistan
2011 NATO attack in Pakistan

References

External links
 Anti-Americanism and Radicalization: A Case Study of Pakistan by Khuram Iqbal (2010)

Pakistan
Pakistan–United States relations